István Fodor (born 2 March 1945) is a former Hungarian politician, who served as Speaker of the National Assembly of Hungary between 1989 and 1990. The Third Hungarian Republic was established on 23 October 1989 and the legislative speaker Mátyás Szűrös became Provisional President of Hungary. Fodor was appointed Speaker besides Szűrös.

After the 1990 elections he became an independent representative in the new National Assembly. He was the chairman of the Alliance of the Hungarian Resistants and Antifascists from 1999 to 2000.

References
 István Fodor Biography by Judit Villám	

1945 births
Living people
Speakers of the National Assembly of Hungary
Members of the National Assembly of Hungary (1985–1990)
Members of the National Assembly of Hungary (1990–1994)